Men Who Save the World is a 2014 internationally co-produced comedy film written and directed by Liew Seng Tat. The film was nominated for multiple awards in international film festivals, and won several awards at the 27th Malaysian Film Festival, including Best Picture.

Cast
 Wan Hanafi Su as Pak Awang
 Soffi Jikan as Wan
 Jjamal Ahmed as Mat Kacamata
 Harun Salim Bachik as Megat
 Azhan Rani as Cina
 Muhammad Farhan Mohamad Nizam as Zakari
 Hazeehan Husain as the Headman's Wife
 Othman Hafsham as Encik Juta Seri
 Jalil Hamid as Tok Bilal
 Azman Hassan as Khamis
 Khalid Mboyelwa Hussein as Solomon
 Bob Idris as Mat Lembu
 Hishamuddin Rais as the Tok Bomoh
 Pitt Hanif as Sharman's Intern

Production
Liew developed Lelaki Harapan Dunia at the Cannes Director's Residence – Cinéfondation and participated at the 2011 Sundance Screenwriters Lab. The film was shot in Kuala Kangsar, Perak. Lelaki Harapan Dunia was supposed to be Liew's debut feature film but he ended up shelving it and making Flower in the Pocket first. The critical success of Liew's debut paved the way for him to receive grants from all over the world for Lelaki Harapan Dunia.

The film is produced by Sharon Gan and is a co-production project between Everything Films Sdn. Bhd. (Malaysia) and Volya Films (The Netherlands), Flying Moon Filmproduktion (Germany) and Mandra Films (France) with support from Ministry of Information, Communication and Culture (Malaysia), TorinoFilmLab (Italy), Hubert Bals Fund (The Netherlands), Netherlands Film Fund, World Cinema Fund (Germany), Visions Sud Est (Switzerland), Fondation Groupama Gan pour le Cinéma – Cinefondation (France), Prince Claus (The Netherlands), Sundance Institute Mahindra Global Filmmaking Award, Sundance Institute Feature Film Program and the Doris Duke Foundation (USA).

Release
The film had its world premiere at the 67th Locarno International Film Festival on 6 August 2014. Its North American premier was held at the 2014 Toronto International Film Festival on 4 September 2014. The film was released in Malaysia on 27 November 2014.

Critical reception
The film got mixed reviews with praise for the humour and stunning cinematography. Critics were also more focused on the issue of the absence of actresses,  homosexuality and racism that exists in this film. Kamran Ahmed of entertainment portal Nextprojection.com in describing the film," It’s an extreme and exaggerated form of humour that works well to make certain ironic or sardonic remarks...". Shelly Kraicer of film portal Cinema-scope.com reviewed this film as "... sets out to be a boisterous comedy of rural cross-dressing and ghostly hauntings, but it has fascinating, somewhat disguised undercurrents suggesting something more serious." Jenna Hossack of dorkshelf.com entertainment portal also provides two words to describe this film, namely "Vibrant and funny". Shane Scott-Travis of entertainment portal vivascene.com give 4 out of 5 stars for this movie. Muzaffar Mustafa from Astro Awani also praised "... among the best films of in aspects of production, both in terms of art direction and cinematography." Irvan Syed Syed Mahdi of Utusan Malaysia praised the film directing and cinematography. Hassan Abd Al-Muttalib from the same newspaper also commented of the film being " a continuation of the early Malaysian cinema". K. Anand of the news portal The Malaysian Insider loomed on the film as "the best local film this year and among the best films of the decade."

Jay Weissberg of Variety criticised the film for playing with issues of homosexuality and racism. "This ultra-light comedy about an apparently haunted house in the jungle is loaded with racially problematic scenes and homophobic gags, plus barely one line is uttered by the marginalized female characters." he stated. Justin Lowe of The Hollywood Reporter stated, "From ridiculing superstitious villagers to stereotyping Africans and completely sidelining women, Liew’s film barrels ahead with barely a clue. His puerile script leads the well-known Malaysian cast members pointlessly astray and returns little on the clearly significant effort required to move the house and shoot extensive footage in the depths of the jungle."  Mark Adams of Screen Daily questioned the absence of actresses in this film. Nazim Masnawi of news portal Malaysiakini observes the film imitating the style of Mamat Khalid's early films but whereas Mamat "still gives sympathy to his character line-up", Liew is "really brutal with his satire".   Aidil Rusli of The Star notes of this movie as being filled with potential yet that can not be translated properly.

Accolades
Lelaki Harapan Dunia swept five awards among other fourteen categories nominated including the prestigious Best Picture and Best Director awards in 27th Malaysian Film Festival.

The film was selected as the Malaysian entry for the Best Foreign Language Film at the 88th Academy Awards but it was not nominated.

See also
 List of submissions to the 88th Academy Awards for Best Foreign Language Film
 List of Malaysian submissions for the Academy Award for Best Foreign Language Film

References

External links
 
 Official website
 Official Facebook page

2014 films
2014 comedy films
Malaysian comedy films
Dutch comedy films
German comedy films
French comedy films
Malay-language films
Films directed by Liew Seng Tat
Films with screenplays by Liew Seng Tat
2010s French films
2010s German films